North Port is a light rail station and a former railway station on Port Melbourne railway line, first significant railway in Melbourne, Australia. The station is located in the inner Melbourne suburb of Port Melbourne, Victoria, Australia. Though it was closed in 1987 for conversion to light rail, Melbourne tram route 109 now runs through the station with newly built low-floor platforms. The station was located to the south of Raglan Street and between Evans Street and Station Street.

History
North Port station opened in 1859 as Raglan Street, as an infill station 5 years after the line to Port Melbourne was opened. Throughout its history, the station has been renamed several times: North Sandridge in 1867, Port Melbourne North in 1886, and finally North Port in 1902.
The station mainly served many of the factories in the area, where workers utilise the station for daily commutes from the city. The station had two sets of interlocked gates at Inglis street and Bridge Street level crossings, controlled by their respective signal boxes. 

The last passenger train ran through the station on 10 October 1987, after it was announced that the line would be converted to light rail. Goods trains had continued to run through the station to Port Melbourne until at least September of that year. The replacement light rail line was officially opened on 18 December 1987. However, the station buildings has since been demolished to make way for its new low-floor platforms.

Tram services
Yarra Trams operates one route via North Port station:
 : Box Hill – Port Melbourne

References

Buildings and structures in the City of Port Phillip
Disused railway stations in Melbourne
Railway stations in Australia opened in 1859
Railway stations closed in 1987
1987 disestablishments in Australia